The Tickhill Psalter is a fourteenth-century illuminated manuscript. The psalter is illustrated with scenes from the life of King David, and is now kept in the New York Public Library.

History
Created in circa 1310, the manuscript was originally part of the library of the Worksop Priory in Nottinghamshire, but is now kept in the New York Public Library. The name most likely derives from the fact that it was produced by the Worksop prior John de Tickhill, who likely came from the nearby South Yorkshire town of Tickhill.

In 1943, Donald Drew Egbert was awarded the fourth-ever Haskins Medal by the Medieval Academy of America for his book on the Tickhill Psalter titled The Tickhill Psalter and Related Manuscripts, which was published by the New York Public Library. Dorothy Miner reviewed the publication in the American Journal of Archaeology in that year.

See also
List of illuminated manuscripts

References

External links
New York Public Library profile

Illuminated psalters
Tickhill
14th-century illuminated manuscripts
Manuscripts in the New York Public Library